HMS Chilcompton was a  of the Royal Navy built by Herd & Mckenzie and launched on 23 October 1953. She had the pennant number of a minesweeper - M1122.

Chilcompton spent the first eight years of her life in the Operational Reserve fleet at Hythe before joining the 9th MSS in the Persian Gulf in May 1962, serving there until September 1965. The ship formed part of the Fishery Protection Squadron from April 1967 to January 1969. She was sold on 26 November 1971.

References

Ton-class minesweepers of the Royal Navy
Ships built in Scotland
1953 ships
Cold War minesweepers of the United Kingdom